The I Live Here Foundation, also commonly referred to as the I Live Here Projects, is a United States 501(c)(3) non profit organization that tells the stories of silenced and unheard people around the world through a series of books and other media projects.

History
The I Live Here foundation was founded in 2005 by Canadian-born actress Mia Kirshner along with J.B. Mackinnon, Paul Shoebridge and Michael Simons. Kirshner is currently the director of the organization.

I Live Here started out as a book documentary about the stories of refugees and displaced women and children in Burma, Juarez, Chechnya, and Malawi. The I Live Here foundation began following the realization that more needed to be done in addition to  the book project.

Kachere Prison Project
In 2005, Mia Kirshner and J.B. MacKinnon traveled to the Kachere juvenile prison located in Lilongwe, the capital city of Malawi. The original purpose for travel was to gather materials for the I Live Here book. Kirshner and MacKinnon met the reality of a widespread AIDS epidemic and found the imprisoned existing in unbearable conditions. Many of the incarcerated children could not read or write.

The goal of I Live Here was then changed, leading to the establishment of the I Live Here foundation. Much of the work that was done at the juvenile prison was based on a system of permaculture.

Book Documentary
I Live Here was released as a book in October 2008 after ten years of work. Throughout this time, Kirshner and many contributors traveled to four different parts of the world, including Chechnya, Burma, Mexico and Malawi. The book is composed of four different volumes, each belonging to that part of the world. Mia Kirshner's younger sister, Lauren Kirshner, a creative writer, was also involved in the writing of the I Live Here Projects. Lauren Kirshner contributed twenty poems for Claudia, a narrative based on family photos, notes by friends, and missing person posters related to one of the hundreds of murdered women in Ciudad Juarez, Chihuahua, Mexico. The book was published by Pantheon Books, a subsidiary of Random House.

In addition to the collaboration of Kirshner, MacKinnon, Shoebridge, and Simons, the book also includes a curriculum developed by novelist Chris Abani, as well as contributions by Joe Sacco, Ann-Marie MacDonald, Phoebe Gloeckner, and many others.

References

501(c)(3) organizations